Milan Crnković (February 15, 1925 – 1998) was a Croatian children's literature professor and critic.

Biography
Crnković was born in the village of  near Ludbreg, in the Podravina region of Croatia. His parents were Franjo and Jelka Crnkovic (née Sever). He was the oldest of four children.

He attended elementary school in the neighboring village of Slokovec. Since the age of ten, he attended a Jesuit "classical gymnasium" in Zagreb. He enrolled at The University of Zagreb. He majored in "History of Literature of People of Yugoslavia" and minored in French language and literature and "Croatian/Serbian Language with Old Church Slavonic and Russian and Latin". He graduated on July 12, 1949. He was the best student in his class. His professor and mentor, Antun Barac, gave him the highest possible score for his thesis on Croatian writer Fran Galović and offered him a position of assistance-ship and his designated successor. The condition of this assistance-ship and succeeding professorship was allegiance to the Communist Party. Milan Crnkovic refused to join the party especially not after the tragedy that had befallen his family.

When World War II ended, the Communists came to power in Yugoslavia. The Communist party killed many priests in Yugoslavia, among them was Milan's uncle, Matija Crnkovic. Matija was arrested, tortured with a hot iron, killed and thrown in the river. In September 1946, three members of the governing Communist Party came to his grandfather, Josip Crnkovic's, house to arrest Josip. The Communist Party members beat and killed Milan's grandfather in front of his whole family. Milan's other uncle, Josip Crnkovic, also a priest, was sentenced to five years in prison.

In September 1949, Crnković accepted a position in a technical high school in Rijeka. On February 15, 1950 he married Anka Sutic in Zagreb. They had three children: Marija, Berislav, and Nella. In 1960, Milan transferred to the newly founded Teacher's College of Rijeka; this college later became part of University of Rijeka. Besides being a lecturer, Milan also served as a director at The Teacher's College of Rijeka and also served as dean for 2 terms.

He started publishing his research and literary essays in "Riječka revija" literary magazine in 1954. He was also co-editor of "Riječka revija" for a few years starting in 1959. From 1985-1993, he was one of the editors of the journal "Dometi". He was a member of the board of "Umjetnost i Dijete". He was a member of the advisory committee of the magazine, "Otrok in Knijiga" from 1976–1983 and magazine "Galeb". From 1957-1967, Milan was editor of series of novels published by Rijeka's publishing house "Otokar Kersovani". He prepared for printing collected works of Honoré de Balzac, Henri Beyle Stendhal, Fyodor Dostoevsky. Theodore Dreiser, and Stefan Zweig. Milan was a member of numerous juries for literature. For example, Rijeka's Foundation, "Drago Gervais" and Belgrade's "Politkin Zabavnik" for children's literature. He participated for commissions for doctoral dissertations and also participated in Croatian Philological Association. He helped to establish Rijeka's journal "Rijec". He published about one-hundred research and literary papers, several translations from French (Honoré de Balzac, Stendhal, François Souchal) English (Daniel Dafoe, Albert Manfred, James Michener, Shel Silverstein, Isaac Singer, and James Thurber) and Russian (Kornej Cukovski). He wrote numerous book reviews and participated in many literary conferences. He was a frequent guest of the children's literary festival "Kurircek" in Maribor and "Zmjeve Djecje Igrein" in Novi Sad. Milan met painter and educator, Bogomil Karlovaris, at the "Zmjeve Djecje Igrein" festival.  He published his own poems in "Riječka revija". Towards the end of his life he published a collection of his own poems, entitled "Godovi". He was longtime head of the Department of Children's Literature at the Teacher's College of Rijeka. He retired in October 1990, but continued working on his publications. He was given an annual award from the city of Rijeka in 1968, 1986, and for his life achievement in 1997. He died from complications of lung cancer on April 20, 1998.

Private life
Milan invented stories for his children, some of which were called "The Adventures of Master Ivan". When he was writing his thesis he often listened to his children's opinions about their thoughts on different books and poems. He even quoted some of children's opinions in his books. For his children and their friends, Milan would often translate the popular Italian children's cartoon "Toppo Gigio" into Croatian for them.

Major works
 Children's Literature, school book. Printed in Zagreb in 1967. This textbook explores the best works and main types of children's literature. It has undergone numerous editions, including one edition in Italian.
 Problems and Criteria in the Evaluation of Children's Literature. Art and the child. Vol 13, pp 5–17. Printed in Zagreb in 1971.
 Vocabulary of Cakavian songs of Dear Gervais. Published in Rijeka in 1975. Exploration of Gervais and his preoccupation with childhood, homeland, movement and action, and rebellion.
 The Narrative of Brlic Mazuranic. Vol 35, p. 2-24. Published in Rijeka in 1975. Published in Italian.
 Stories of Duro Turic. Vol 2, p 109-115. Published in Rijeka in 1977. Explorations of the old Croatian children's author's works.
 Croatian Children's Literature to the End of the 19th Century. School book published in Zagreb in 1978. This is a history of Croatian children's literature from a certain period. Follows the initiators of Croatian children's literature and important magazines for children and adolescents.
 The Nonsense Grammar and Style of Zvonimir Balog. Vol 3 p 36-36. Published in Novi Sad in 1979. This explores the nonsense poetry of Zvonimir Balog.
 Society in Children's Literature. Vol 65, p 17-29. Published in Zagreb in 1980. Explores social problems in children's literature.
 A Children's Story.  Published in Novi Sad in 1982. Explores the idea that story and narrative are not the same.
 Telegraphic or Epigrammatic fables of Gustav Krkleca. Vol 4, p 35-52. Published in Zagreb in 1983. Analysis of Krkleca's children's songs.
 Antun Barac and Croatian Children's Literature. Proceedings of Barcev. University of Zagreb, 1984.
 What Children's Stories (anthology of children's stories with interpretations. Published in Zagreb in 1987.

References

 Milan Nosic - Biography and Bibliography of Milan Crnkovic. Riječ. 2009, vol 4 p 8-33

1925 births
1998 deaths
Croatian children's writers